Lucien Voulzy (born 18 December 1948), better known as Laurent Voulzy, is a French singer-songwriter, composer and musician.

Life and career
Voulzy was born in Paris, France. He originally led the English-pop-influenced Le Temple de Vénus before joining Pascal Danel as guitarist from 1969 to 1974. However, he is best known for his collaborative songwriting efforts with singer-songwriter Alain Souchon and his solo singing career, which spanned several successful singles and albums.

Voulzy had an international hit with the song "Rockollection". The French lyrics were interspersed with some lines from classic rock hits after the chorus. 
His major hits also include the singles "Paradoxal Système" (which reached the French Top 10), "Le Soleil Donne" – sung in French, English and Spanish – and the double "Belle-Île-en-Mer, Marie-Galante"/"Les Nuits Sans Kim Wilde" ("Nights without Kim Wilde"; a song inspired by the chart-topping English singer). Other songs entered the French charts ("Bopper en larmes", "Le coeur Grenadine", "Désir, désir", etc.). 
Voulzy also enjoys success in Belgium, Switzerland and Québec; and although being a French artist, his songs often contain multiple languages (including lyrics in English, Spanish, Portuguese, German, etc.).

In 2005, he co-produced and co-composed Nolwenn Leroy's second album Histoires Naturelles.

Voulzy had a huge hit with his album La Septième Vague which reached number one in 2006. Featured on the album is a cover of the Everly Brothers hit "All I Have to Do Is Dream", recorded as a duet with Irish singer Andrea Corr. The song was released as a single and was also included on The Corrs' greatest hits album Dreams: The Ultimate Corrs Collection.

He recorded in 2007 a duet with the French guitarist Jean-Pierre Danel on his hit album Guitar Connection 2. The song hit the French charts at No. 7 in 2008. For his 2011 album, Lys and Love, Voulzy recorded a duet on the song "Ma seule amour" with English singer Roger Daltrey of The Who. In 2007, He toured France.

Discography

Studio albums

Live albums

Compilations

Singles
1977: "Rockollection"
1978: "Bubble Star"
1979: "Le Cœur grenadine"
1979: "Karin Redinger"
1979: "Cocktail chez Mademoiselle"
1980: "Surfing Jack"
1981: "Idéal simplifié"
1983: "Bopper en larmes"
1983: "Liebe"

References

External links 

  Laurent Voulzy (official site)
 Biography of Laurent Voulzy, from Radio France Internationale

1948 births
Living people
Musicians from Paris
Singers from Paris
20th-century French composers
21st-century French composers
21st-century French singers
French pop singers
French singer-songwriters
20th-century French male musicians
21st-century French male singers
French male singer-songwriters